SS William Cox was a Liberty ship built in the United States during World War II.

Construction
William Cox was laid down on 4 December 1944, under a Maritime Commission (MARCOM) contract, MC hull 2394, by J.A. Jones Construction, Brunswick, Georgia; she was sponsored by Mrs. Arlee Cox, widow of the namesake, and launched on 31 December 1944.

History
She was allocated to Blidberg & Rothchild Co., Inc., on 10 January 1945. On 3 May 1948, she was laid up in the National Defense Reserve Fleet, in Wilmington, North Carolina. On 6 July 1967, she was sold, along with her sister ship , for $91,340, to Union Minerals and Alloys Corporation, for scrapping. She was removed from the fleet on 28 July 1967.

References

Bibliography

 
 
 
 
 

 

Liberty ships
Ships built in Brunswick, Georgia
1944 ships
Wilmington Reserve Fleet